Carabus agnatus is a species of black or purple-coloured beetle in the family Carabidae that is can be found in Georgia and Russia.

References

agnatus
Beetles described in 1889